Dale C. Williams (March 2, 1920 - May 12, 1955) served as a member of the California State Senate, representing the 1st District from 1953 to 1955. He died in office in 1955.

During World War II he served in the United States Army.

References

Democratic Party California state senators
1955 deaths
20th-century American politicians
1920 births
United States Army personnel of World War II